Archidiptera is a suborder of Diptera under an alternative classification based largely on fossil taxa; it has not gained wide acceptance among non-paleontological dipterists.

Its sole living representative, the family Nymphomyiidae, is normally considered a member of the Blephariceromorpha within the Nematocera.

References 

Diptera taxonomy
Insect suborders
Prehistoric Diptera